The Sarles–Crystal City Border Crossing connects the towns of Sarles, North Dakota and Crystal City, Manitoba on the Canada–United States border. North Dakota Highway 20 on the American side joins Manitoba Highway 34 on the Canadian side.

Canadian side
In 1897, E.M. Kerr was the inaugural customs officer, such duties having previously been performed by the North-West Mounted Police. In 1899, the status was upgraded to an outport of entry under the administrative oversight of the Port of Winnipeg. The current station was built in 1955.

US side
In 1961, the US built the Sarles border station in the median of the roadway. In 2012, this facility was replaced with a large modern border station. In 2014, the Sarles Port of Entry processed an average of 10 passenger cars and 3 trucks per day.

See also
 List of Canada–United States border crossings

References

Canada–United States border crossings
1889 establishments in Manitoba
1889 establishments in North Dakota